Calpulalpan is a municipality in Tlaxcala in south-eastern Mexico. The area of the municipality is 254.82 km².

References

Municipalities of Tlaxcala
Nahua settlements